Neoscythris is a genus of moths in the family Scythrididae.

Species
 Neoscythris confinis (Braun, 1920)
 Neoscythris euthia (Walsingham, 1914)
 Neoscythris fissirostris (Meyrick, 1928)
 Neoscythris planipenella (Chambers, 1875)

References

Scythrididae
Moth genera